The Xianfeng Emperor (17 July 1831 – 22 August 1861), or by temple name Emperor Wenzong of Qing, given name Yizhu, was the eighth emperor of the Qing dynasty, and the seventh Qing emperor to rule over China proper, reigned from 1850 to 1861. During his reign, the Qing dynasty experienced several wars and rebellions including the Taiping Rebellion, Nian Rebellion, and Second Opium War (Arrow War). He was the last Chinese emperor to have authoritarian and total executive ruling power. After his death, the Qing government was controlled by Empress Dowager Cixi.

Family and early life 
Yizhu was born in 1831 at the Old Summer Palace, eight kilometres northwest of Beijing. He was from the Manchu Aisin Gioro clan, and was the fourth son of the Daoguang Emperor. His mother was the Noble Consort Quan, of the Manchu Niohuru clan, who was made Empress in 1834, and is known posthumously as Empress Xiaoquancheng. Yizhu was reputed to have an ability in literature and administration which surpassed most of his brothers, which impressed his father, who therefore decided to make him his successor.

Early reign 
Yizhu succeeded the throne in 1850, at age 19, and was a relatively young emperor. He inherited a dynasty that faced not only internal but also foreign challenges. Yizhu's reign title, "Xianfeng", which means "universal prosperity", did not reflect the situation. In 1850, the first of a series of popular rebellions began that would nearly destroy the Qing dynasty. The Taiping Rebellion began in December 1850, when Hong Xiuquan, a Hakka leader of a syncretic Christian sect, defeated local forces sent to disperse his followers. Hong then proclaimed the establishment of the Taiping Heavenly Kingdom and the rebellion spread to several provinces with amazing speed. The following year, the Nian Rebellion started in North China. Unlike the Christian-influenced Taiping rebels, the Nian movement lacked a clear political program, but they became a serious threat to the Qing capital, Beijing, with the mobility of their cavalry-based armies. The Qing imperial forces suffered repeated defeats at the hands of both rebel movements.

Rebellions and wars 
In 1853, the Taiping rebels captured Nanjing and for a while it seemed that Beijing would fall next; but the Taiping northern expedition was defeated and the situation stabilized. The Xianfeng Emperor dispatched several prominent mandarins, such as Zeng Guofan and the Mongol general Sengge Rinchen, to crush the rebellions, but they only obtained limited success. The biggest revolt of the Miao people against Chinese rule in history started in 1854, and ravaged the region until finally put down in 1873. In 1856, an attempt to regain Nanjing was defeated and the Panthay Rebellion broke out in Yunnan.

Meanwhile, an initially minor incident on the coasts triggered the Second Opium War. Anglo-French forces, after inciting a few battles (not all victories for them) on the coast near Tianjin, attempted "negotiation" with the Qing government. The Xianfeng Emperor believed in Chinese superiority and would not agree to any colonial demands. He delegated Prince Gong for several negotiations but relations broke down completely when a British diplomat, Sir Harry Parkes, was arrested during negotiations on 18 September.

The Anglo-French invasion clashed with Sengge Rinchen's Mongol cavalry on 18 September near Zhangjiawan before proceeding toward the outskirts of Beijing for a decisive battle in Tongzhou District, Beijing. On 21 September, at the Battle of Palikao, Sengge Rinchen's 10,000 troops, including his elite Mongol cavalry, were completely annihilated after several doomed frontal charges against the concentrated firepower of the Anglo-French forces, which entered Beijing on 6 October.

On 18 October 1860, the British and French forces went on to loot and burn the Old Summer Palace and Summer Palace. Upon learning about this news, the Xianfeng Emperor's health quickly deteriorated.

During the Xianfeng Emperor's reign, China lost part of Manchuria to the Russian Empire. In 1858, according to the Treaty of Aigun, the territory between the Stanovoy Range and the Amur River was ceded to Russia, and in 1860, according to the Treaty of Beijing, the same thing happened also to the area east of the Ussuri River. After that treaty, the Russians founded the city of Vladivostok in the area they had annexed.

While negotiations with the European powers were being held, the Xianfeng Emperor and his imperial entourage fled to Jehol province in the name of conducting the annual imperial hunting expedition. As his health worsened, the emperor's ability to govern also deteriorated, and competing ideologies in court led to the formation of two distinct factions — one led by the senior official Sushun and the princes Zaiyuan and Duanhua, and the other led by Noble Consort Yi, who was supported by the general Ronglu and the Bannermen of the Yehe Nara clan.

Death
The Xianfeng Emperor died on 22 August 1861, from a short life of overindulgence, at the Chengde Mountain Resort, 230 kilometres northeast of Beijing. His successor was his surviving six-year-old son, Zaichun. A day before his death, the Xianfeng Emperor had summoned Sushun and his supporters to his bedside and gave them an imperial edict that dictated the power structure during his son's minority. The edict appointed eight men – Zaiyuan, Duanhua, Jingshou, Sushun, Muyin, Kuangyuan, Du Han and Jiao Youying – as an eight-member regency council to aid Zaichun, who was later enthroned as the Tongzhi Emperor. Xianfeng gave the eight men the power of regency, but their edicts would have to be endorsed by Noble Consort Yi and Empress Consort Zhen. By tradition, after the death of an emperor, the emperor's body was to be accompanied to the capital by the regents. Noble Consort Yi and Empress Consort Zhen, who were now known as Empress Dowagers Cixi and Ci'an travelled ahead to Beijing and planned a coup with Prince Gong that ousted the eight regents. Empress Dowager Cixi then effectively ruled China over the subsequent 47 years as a regent.

The Xianfeng Emperor was interred in the Eastern Qing Tombs, 125 kilometres/75 miles east of Beijing, in the Ding (定; lit. "Quietude") mausoleum complex.

Legacy

The Qing dynasty continued to decline during the reign of the Xianfeng Emperor. Rebellions in the country, which began the first year of his reign, would not be quelled until well into the reign of the Tongzhi Emperor and resulted in millions of deaths. The Xianfeng Emperor also had to deal with the British and French and their ever-growing appetite to expand trade further into China. The Xianfeng Emperor, like his father, the Daoguang Emperor, understood very little about Europeans and their mindset. He viewed non-Chinese as inferior and regarded the repeated requests by the Europeans for the establishment of diplomatic relations as an offence. When the Europeans introduced the long-held concept of an exchanged consular relationship, the Xianfeng Emperor quickly rebuffed the idea. At the time of his death, he had not met with any foreign dignitary.

Despite his tumultuous decade of reign, the Xianfeng Emperor was commonly seen as the last Qing emperor to have held paramount authority, ruling in his own right. The reigns of his son and subsequent successors were overseen by regents, a trend present until the fall of the Qing dynasty.

Family 

Empress

 Empress Xiaodexian (孝德顯皇后) of the Sakda clan (薩克達氏)
 Empress Xiaozhenxian (孝貞顯皇后) of the Niohuru clan (鈕祜祿氏)
 Empress Xiaoqinxian (孝欽顯皇后) of the Yehe Nara clan (葉赫那拉), Personal name: Xingzhen (杏貞) ; commonly known as     Empress Dowager Cixi (慈禧皇太后)
 Zaichun, the Tongzhi Emperor (穆宗 載淳; 27 April 1856 – 12 January 1875), first son

Imperial Noble Consort

 Imperial Noble Consort Zhuangjing (莊靜皇貴妃) of the Tatara clan (他他拉氏)
 Princess Rong'an of the First Rank (榮安固倫公主; 20 June 1855 – 5 February 1875), first daughter
 Married Fuzhen (d. 1909) of the Manchu Gūwalgiya clan in September/October 1873

 Imperial Noble Consort Duanke (端恪皇貴妃) of the Tunggiya clan (佟佳氏)

Noble Consort

  Noble Consort Wen (玟貴妃) of the Xu clan (徐氏)
 Prince Min of the Second Rank (憫郡王; 8 January 1859), second son

 Noble Consort Wan (婉貴妃) of the Socoro clan (索綽絡氏)

Consort

 Consort Lu (璷妃) of the Yehe Nara clan (葉赫那拉氏)
 Consort Ji (吉妃) of the Wang clan (王氏)
 Miscarriage (male; 1859 or 1860)
 Consort Xi (禧妃) of the Cahala clan (察哈喇氏), Personal Name: Haitangchun (海棠春)
 Consort Qing (慶妃) of the Zhang clan (張氏)

Imperial Concubine

 Imperial Concubine Yun (雲嬪) of the Wugiya clan (武佳氏), Personal Name: Qiyun (绮云)
 Imperial Concubine Rong (容嬪,) of the Irgen Gioro clan (伊爾根覺羅氏) 
 Imperial Concubine Shu (璹嬪) of the Yehe Nara clan (葉赫那拉氏)
 Imperial Concubine Yu (玉嬪) of the Yehe Nara clan (葉赫那拉氏)

First Class Female Attendant

 First Class Female Attendant Chun (瑃常在) of the Ming'an clan (暝谙氏)
 First Class Female Attendant Xin (鑫常在) of the Daigiya clan (戴佳氏)
 First Class Female Attendant Ping (玶常在) of the Irgen Gioro clan (伊尔根觉罗氏)

Ancestry

See also 

 Family tree of Chinese monarchs (late)
 Second Opium War (1856–1860)
 Treaties of Tianjin (1858)
 Convention of Peking (1860)

References

Citations

Sources 

 
 
  
  
 
 

 Books about Empress Dowager Cixi

 Sterling Seagraves "Dragon Lady" 
 Maria Warners "The Dragon Empress: Life and Times of Tz'u-Hsi, 1835 – 1908, Empress of China". 
 Anchee Min "Empress Orchid"

External links 

 

1831 births
1861 deaths
Qing dynasty emperors
19th-century Chinese monarchs
1850s in China
1860s in China
Daoguang Emperor's sons